"Bell Boy" is a song recorded by the Who for the 1973 album Quadrophenia and 1979 movie of the same name. It was never released as a single.

Music and lyrics
Besides the main lead vocals by lead singer Roger Daltrey, the song features vocals by drummer Keith Moon (most of whose relatively few vocals for the band dated from the '60s). Moon mostly talks (or sings) his lines in a cartoonish voice with an exaggerated cockney accent, however, the bridge and the last line are sung in his natural voice. The shouts of "Bell Boy" are the lines of Jimmy from the disgusted realization of what the Ace Face actually was, symbolic of the theme of disillusionment throughout the album.

Lyrically, this is the final straw for Jimmy, having just found out that the Ace-Face he had looked up to as a Mod was now a Bell Boy, working for everyone rather than ruling over everyone at the same Brighton hotel the Mods had smashed up back in 1963 ("I don't suppose you would remember me/But I used to follow you back in '63").  The previous lines ("Ain't you the guy who used to set the paces/Riding up in front of a hundred faces") refer to the "Hundred Faces", a fan club set up by the Who's managers Kit Lambert and Chris Stamp to promote the group in their early days.

In the short story written by Townshend in the album's libretto/liner notes, it is explained that Jimmy never thought he'd be let down by being a Mod (given everything else had let him down). Pete Townshend said of the song's meaning:

Live history
The band performed this in The Who Tour 1973 and 1974 as part of their Quadrophenia set. This quickly became a fan favourite because of Moon's comedic vocals, and fans persisted on requesting it even after it was dropped in 1975 until Moon's death. The song was revived for the 1996-1997 Quadrophenia world tour, but with the Ace-Face guest replacing Moon's role. The song was performed once more at the Royal Albert Hall in London on 30 March 2010 at a benefit concert for the Teenage Cancer Trust. Tom Meighan of Kasabian sang Moon's part during the show.  At Quadrophenia and More shows and 12-12-12: The Concert for Sandy Relief, it was performed with archival video footage of Keith Moon in Charlton.

Personnel
 Roger Daltrey – lead vocals, backing vocals
 Pete Townshend – lead guitar, backing vocals, synthesizer, piano
 John Entwistle – bass guitar, backing vocals, French horn
 Keith Moon – co-lead vocals, drums

In other media
Martin Scorsese reprised the song for the soundtrack of his 1999 film Bringing Out The Dead.

References

Further reading
 The Hypertext Who › Liner Notes › Quadrophenia

1973 songs
The Who songs
Song recordings produced by Kit Lambert
Song recordings produced by Glyn Johns
Songs written by Pete Townshend
Song recordings produced by Pete Townshend